Microtrombidiidae is a family of micro velvet mites in the order Trombidiformes. There are about five genera and seven described species in Microtrombidiidae.

Genera
 Ettmulleria
 Eutrombidium
 Holcotrombidium
 Microtrombidium
 Platytrombidium

References

Further reading

 
 
 
 

Trombidiformes
Acari families